Godavarikhani is a neighbourhood of Ramagundam city in the Indian state of Telangana. It is also called as the Coal City and City of Black Gold. The name of the city was coined by Geetla Janardhan Reddy as it is situated on the banks of the Godavari River and Khani which refers to mines/minerals as the city is known for its rich coal mines. It is a part of Ramagundam Municipal Corporation, located on the banks of Godavari River in Peddapalli district. Godavarikhani is Rich in Coal reserves and NTPC Limited (a Maharatna company) is located in Godavarikhani which supplies electricity to 5 south Indian states including Goa. FCI (Fertilizer Corporation of India) & RFCL are located in Jyothi Nagar. Ramagundam and Godavarikhani are twin cities. It is served by Ramagundam railway station (Major Railway Route connecting North to south India), State Highway 1 (Telangana), also called as Rajeev Rahadari (HKR Roadways), and Ramagundam Airport in Basanthnagar. It's one of a few Municipal Corporations in Telangana. Godavarikhani is among the state's most populous city after Warangal and Karimnagar. Ramagundam is one of the most important divisions of Singareni collieries and due to its proximity Singareni Collieries Company Limited (SCCL) is planning to open its corporate headquarters. It has open cast coal projects, Coal mines and privileged Adriyala longwall Projects area of SCCL. Godavarikhani records the highest temperature in Telangana.

Demographics 

As per reports of Census of India, population of Godavarikhani in 2011 was 229,644; of which male and female were 116,748 and 112,896 respectively. Although Godavarikhani city had a population of 229,644; its urban / metropolitan population was 252,308 of which 128,239 were males and 124,069 were females.

Hinduism is the majority religion in Godavarikhani city with 88.60 % followers. Islam is the second most popular religion with approximately 9.68 % following it.  Christianity is followed by 1.22 %, Jainism by 0.01 %, Sikhism by 0.09 % and Buddhism by 0.09 %. Approximately 0.39 % stated 'other Religion'.

Education 

Godavarikhani is an education center in Peddapalli District, Telangana, and has produced many renowned intellectuals, lawyers, politicians, poets, and technologists over several decades. Many software students, born and educated in Godavarikhani, have migrated to major metropolitan areas in India and across the globe.

There are many schools and intermediate colleges in the city. Godavarikhani has Technology institutes, Polytechnic college, Degree & Post Graduated colleges and the CBSE School, Kendriya Vidyalaya, NTPC Ramagundam

Government and politics

Law and order 
Ramagundam Police Commissionerate is a city police force headquartered at Godavarikhani with primary responsibilities in law enforcement and investigation within Peddapalli  and Mancherial Districts.

Politics 
Korukanti Chandar, who won as MLA in the 2018 elections from Ramagundam constituency as an AIFB candidate against Former MLA Somarapu Satyanarayana who is representing the TRS party.
Somarapu Satyanarayana, who won as MLA in the 2014 elections from Ramagundam constituency, has been appointed as Telangana's first TSRTC Public Transport Chairman in 2016.

Transport

Air
Ramagundam Airport is old airport and government is planning to reopen this runway and develop as brownfield airport due to its proximity in between 4 districts and to make it connected to major cities.

Bus
Godavarikhani (GDK) (Black diamond) bus depot of TSRTC ply buses to surrounding villages as well as interstate destinations. There is direct connectivity of Four Lane Express Highway road from Hyderabad – Karimnagar – Ramagundam Highway which is called Rajeev Rahadari (State Highway 1 (Telangana)). There is direct connectivity to  Bengaluru  by  TSRTC  and other Private Operators like Diwakar and Orange Travels.

Rail
Ramagundam railway station provides rail connectivity and its A1+ category station and on Chennai central to New Delhi main railway line which is also a potential stoppage in terms of revenue and passengers. Ramagundam has direct connectivity to almost all major cities and towns of India like Mumbai, Delhi,  Chennai, Varanasi, Hyderabad, Bengaluru, Kochi, Visakhapatnam, Vijayawada, Ahmedabad, Surat, Jaipur, Jammu, Mangalore, Gauhati, Trivandrum Central, Kanyakumari, Pune, Patna, Bhubaneshwar, Shri Mata Vaishno Devi Katra etc.,

See also 
List of cities in Telangana by population
List of cities in Telangana by area

References 

Cities and towns in Karimnagar district